Gravity is the fifth studio album by American country music duo Big & Rich, and was released on September 23, 2014.  The duo announced that they had begun work on their next album in summer 2013 before releasing the album's lead off single, "Look at You," in January 2014.  In addition to releasing the single, the duo announced that they had started their own record label, Big & Rich Records, which will handle the release of this album.

Overview
With the release of Hillbilly Jedi in 2012, Big & Rich were once again working as a duo after a lengthy hiatus.   In mid 2013, the duo had unofficially begun work on a followup.  News was sporadic, with John Rich posting updates on his Twitter feed about the recording process.  He mentioned having "cut ten songs" in July, whilst also making note of the fact that he and Big Kenny "actually agreed on something in the studio."  Big & Rich kept the project on a small scale, only previewing the music for their label Warner Bros. Nashville, who claimed that it was their "best material since Horse of a Different Color."

On January 28, 2014, the album was officially announced along with the release of the album's debut single, "Look at You" and the news that the duo had parted ways with Warner Bros. in favor of a self-owned record label.  Big & Rich posted a video detailing their new single and record label on their YouTube channel in February, claiming that they wanted to control the release schedule of their music so they could "cut a song and have it in the fans' hands the next day."  After amicably parting ways with Warner Bros., the duo worked at their own pace and completed the album.  In a solo interview, Big Kenny mentioned that having complete control of their musical endeavors would allow the duo to "see what's working and what isn't," as well as to release the album when they see fit.  Kenny also made mention of a duet with Tim McGraw that might appear on the album.  On July 28, the duo officially announced the release date of the album through their Facebook page.  The track listing and cover art were revealed the same day in a press release on BigandRich.com.

In an exclusive interview with Nashville.com, Big & Rich shared their thoughts on the album and their decision to start an independent record label.  Of the lead single "Look at You," Rich said that the song "was written by Shannon Lawson and myself. Shannon is a Musik Mafia guy from way back and really a phenomenal singer. We had this idea. I said “have you ever broken up with a girl, you go down to the bar and you’re single again, and you see her? She’s looking hotter than she’s ever looked before on purpose, she’s doing shots and other guys are looking at her. That happened to me every time I ever broke up with anybody” and I said, “That’s what I want to write about.”"  "Lovin' Lately," the duet with Tim McGraw, was confirmed as the follow-up single due to be released in late 2014.  The duo said that their decision to strike it out on their own was the result of Warner Bros. Nashville's schedule not allowing for Gravity to be released until 2015 at the earliest.  Rather than have the project shelved, Big & Rich opted to start their label and release the album sooner.  Of the decision to form their own label, Kenny said that "it’s the kind of thing we believed in ten years ago as the Musik Mafia. Just anyway to get the music out there."

The album's three singles are "Look at You", "Run Away with You", and "Lovin' Lately", a duet with Tim McGraw. Group member John Rich co-wrote all three singles.

Pre-release
Gravity was included in a list by Rolling Stone of 13 must-hear country albums that would be releasing in September 2014.  The publication acknowledged that the album finds the duo "taking their lyrical prowess and signature harmonies to new levels."  On September 13, Big & Rich announced via their Facebook that the entirety of Gravity would be available for streaming a full week before release exclusively through Pandora Radio.  In anticipation of the Gravity'''s release, Big & Rich hosted a release party in New York City on release date and another in Los Angeles on October 1.  Each ticket purchased included a free copy of the album.

Reception

Critical
The album has received critical acclaim.  In a pre-release review for Country Music Chat, Nicole Piering expressed that "this album has a track for everyone, truly defying gravity."  Christina Petrino wrote for Ride of Fame that "Big Kenny and John Rich are back with their big hearts, rocking personality and a country masterpiece."  She awarded the album 4.5 out of 5 stars.  New England Country Music praised each of the tracks concluding that " you don’t want to overlook this album- make sure you purchase ‘Gravity.’"  Allmusic's Stephen Thomas Erlewine criticized the duo's harmonies, but ultimately concluded that "it's possible to hear Gravity through those harmonies and appreciate it as the finely constructed piece of adult contemporary it is."  He awarded the album 3.5 out of 5 stars.  Erik Ernst wrote in his positive review for Journal Sentinel that "Big & Rich have released a mature set of songs that find the still fun-loving pair sounding kind of classic."  In a preview for the radio station WOW Country, Rich Summers expressed the merits of each of the album's tracks as well as imploring readers "don’t leave this one out of your collection. You won’t be sorry."

CommercialGravity'' debuted at number 8 on the country music album charts with first week sales of 7,000 units.  The album has sold 37,700 copies in the US as of August 2015.

Track listing

Personnel

Big and Rich
 Big Kenny - vocals
 John Rich - vocals

Additional Musicians
 Tyler Cain - electric guitar
 Shawn Fichter - drums
 Larry Gatlin - background vocals
 Mike Johnson - steel guitar
 Troy Lancaster - electric guitar
 Brent Mason - electric guitar
 Tim McGraw - vocals on "Lovin' Lately"
 Greg Morrow - drums, drum loops, percussion
 Danny Rader - banjo, bouzouki, acoustic guitar, mandolin
 Michael Rhodes - bass guitar
 Jeff Roach - Hammond B-3 organ, keyboards, piano
 Aaron Rochotte - background vocals
 Mike Rojas - Hammond B-3 organ, keyboards, piano
 Adam Shoenfeld - electric guitar
 Jimmie Lee Sloas - bass guitar
 John Willis - banjo, bouzouki, acoustic guitar

Chart performance

Album

Singles

References

2014 albums
Big & Rich albums
Albums produced by John Rich